Vikram Usendi is an Indian politician and former Cabinet minister in Government of Chhattisgarh. He was also Member of 16th Lok Sabha representing Kanker of Chhattisgarh and State President of Bharatiya Janata Party Chhattisgarh.

Political career
Usendi was first elected to Madhya Pradesh Legislative Assembly in 1993 from Narayanpur and again contested 1998 Assembly election but lost to his Congress rival Manturam Pawar. In 2003 Chhattisgarh Assembly election, he won by huge margin of 8,814 votes. In 2008 election, he won from newly established Antagarh Constituency and also retained the seat in 2013. In 2014 general election, he was elected as member of parliament to the 16th Lok Sabha from Kanker (Lok Sabha constituency), Chhattisgarh.

References

Living people
People from Narayanpur district
India MPs 2014–2019
Lok Sabha members from Chhattisgarh
Bharatiya Janata Party politicians from Chhattisgarh
1965 births
People from Kanker district
People from Kondagaon district
State Presidents of Bharatiya Janata Party